Soil enzymes are a group of enzymes found in soil. They are excreted by soil microbes such as fungi, bacteria and archaea, and play a key role in decomposing soil organic matter into humus, in the process releasing nutrients essential for the growth of plants. Some soil enzymes such as ureases may be inhibited by ingredients in fertiliser to delay release of the nutrients over an extended period.

References

Soil